is a ghazal (love-song) by the 14th-century Persian poet Hafez of Shiraz. In this poem, Hafez is visited in the night by a former beloved, and it becomes clear through metaphorical language that the encounter is successful. There is no hint of any Sufic or esoteric connection in this poem. The poem is no. 26 in the edition of Muhammad Qazvini and Qasem Ghani (1941).

The poem
In the transcription below, "x" = kh as in Khayyam, ' is a glottal stop. Overlong syllables, which take up the time of a long plus a short syllable in the metre, are underlined.

1

Tousled-hair and sweating and smiling-lipped and drunk,
shirt-torn and singing songs and wine-flask in hand,

2

Her/His eye looking for a quarrel and her/his lip mocking,
at midnight last night s/he came to my pillow and sat down.

3

S/He brought his/her head close to my ear and in a plaintive voice
said "Hey, old-time lover of mine, are you asleep?"

4

A lover to whom they give such nocturnal wine
is an infidel of Love if he doesn't become a worshipper of wine!

5

Go, ascetic, and do not criticise those who drink the dregs!
Since they didn't give anything but this gift to us on the day of the Covenant.

6

Whatever He poured into our cup, we drank,
whether it is of the wine of paradise or the drunkard's brew.

7

The smile of a cup of wine and the curly hair of a beauty –
how many repentances have they broken like the repentance of Hafez!

The metre

The metre is called ramal-e maxbūn ("hemmed ramal "), since in contrast to the usual ramal with its feet of – u – –, all the feet except the first are "hemmed", that is, shortened, to u u – –. It is a catalectic metre since the last foot fa'ilātun lacks the final syllable and becomes fa'ilun.

In the scheme below, x = anceps (i.e. long or short syllable), u = a short syllable, and – = a long syllable:

| x u – – | u u – – | u u – – | u u – |

In Elwell-Sutton's system of Persian metres this metre is classified as 3.1.15. The final pair of short syllables is biceps, that is, the two short syllables may be replaced by a single long syllable; this occurs in about 35% of lines. The first syllable in this metre is long in about 80% of lines.

This metre is fairly common in classical Persian lyric poetry, and is used in 143 (27%) of the 530 poems of Hafez.

Notes on individual verses

Verse 1
The gender of the person described is not made clear in the Persian; it could be a man or a woman, and is possibly left deliberately ambiguous by Hafez. However, in view of the long tradition of homoerotic Persian love poetry in the centuries before Hafez, it is most likely that the person is male. "Many of the unusual attributes of the 'beloved' can be understood by recalling that in the classical lyric poetry the image of the poet's sweetheart refers more often than not to a male figure, normally a youth".

Verses 1, 2 and 7 have echoes of the opening verses of a well-known poem of the 13th-century mystic poet Iraqi which begins:

"From behind the curtain came out the wine-pourer, a cup in hand;
He both tore our curtain, and broke our resolution.
He showed his beautiful face, we all became insane;
When nothing remained of us, he came and sat down beside us."

The same Iraqi poem opening is imitated in Hafez's ghazal 27.

As Edward Granville Browne translates it, Iraqi's poem contains Sufic imagery, but most commentators do not see this ghazal of Hafez as having a Sufic interpretation.

Verse 2
  is literally a narcissus-flower, but here refers to the eye.

  suggests banter, mockery, teasing, jesting.

Verse 5
The phrase  "the day of 'Am I not?' " refers to the occasion, early in the history of creation, when, according to Qur'ān 7.172, God removed Adam's as-yet-unborn descendants from the loins of Adam's children and asked them "Am I not your Lord?", and they replied "Yes! We have born witness". It is also known as the day of the Primordial Covenant. See further: Covenant (religion)#Islam.

Verse 7
The word   means "vowing to sin no more; repenting; repentance, penitence; conversion; abjuring; renouncing; recantation". With this word Hafez indicates that he knew that what he did was a sin, but nonetheless he did it.

Other Hafez poems
There are articles on the following poems by Hafez on Wikipedia. The number in the edition by Muhammad Qazvini and Qasem Ghani (1941) is given:
Alā yā ayyoha-s-sāqī – QG 1
Shirazi Turk – QG 3
Dūš dīdam ke malā'ek – QG 184
Naqdhā rā bovad āyā – QG 185
Goftā borūn šodī – QG 406
Mazra'-ē sabz-e falak – QG 407
Sīne mālāmāl – QG 470

Further reading
 Arberry, A. J. (1947). Fifty Poems of Hafiz, p. 90, containing a translation of this poem by Walter Leaf.
 Avery, Peter; Heath-Stubbs, John (1952). Hafiz of Shiraz: Thirty Poems, page 30.
 de Bruijn, J. T. P. (2002/2012). Hafez iii. Hafez's Poetic Art. Encyclopaedia Iranica online.
 Clarke, H. Wilberforce (1891). The Divan-i-Hafiz Vol. ii. p. 111.
 "EIr" (2004, updated 2012). "Homosexuality in Persian literature". Encyclopaedia Iranica online.
 Kadi (Al-Qadi), Wadad (2003). "The Primordial Covenant and Human History in the Qur'ān". Proceedings of the American Philosophical Society, Vol. 147, No. 4 (Dec., 2003), pp. 332–338.

References

External links
Hafez's Wineflask in hand recited in Persian by the poet Nader Naderpour. 3.1.15
Hafez's Wineflask in hand recited in Persian by Fereidoun Farahanduz, Soheyl Ghassemi, and Mohsen Layle Kuhi. 3.1.15
Calligraphic version of the poem

Ghazals by Hafez
Medieval Persian literature
14th-century poems